The Triumphs of Oriana is a book of English madrigals, compiled and published in 1601 by Thomas Morley, which first edition has 25 pieces by 23 composers (Thomas Morley and Ellis Gibbons have two madrigals).  It was said to have been made to honour Queen Elizabeth I. Every madrigal in the collection contains the following couplet at the end: “Then sang the shepherds and nymphs of Diana: long live fair Oriana” (the word "Oriana" often being used to refer to Queen Elizabeth) though some of the composers wrote variants of this refrain.

Recently, the attribution of "Oriana" to Elizabeth has come into question.  Evidence has been presented that "Oriana" actually refers to Anne of Denmark, who would become Queen of England alongside James VI of Scotland (later James I of England) in an apparently failed early attempt to remove Elizabeth in order to restore England to Catholicism.  In his book 'The English Madrigalists', Edmund Fellowes, the most prolific of madrigal editors of the earlier 20th century, disapproved of the theory.

Contents

Choral Songs in Honour of Her Majesty Queen Victoria (1899)

In 1899, at the instigation of Sir Walter Parratt, Master of the Queen's Music, 13 British composers contributed songs to a collection modeled on The Triumphs of Oriana, entitled Choral Songs in Honour of Her Majesty Queen Victoria, published on the occasion of Victoria's 80th birthday.

A Garland for the Queen (1953)
A Garland for the Queen, a compilation along similar lines, containing pieces by ten composers, was published to mark the coronation of Queen Elizabeth II.

Recordings
The Triumphs of Oriana: Madrigals Pro Cantione Antiqua, Ian Partridge Archiv
I Fagiolini
The King's Singers

See also

The Oxford Book of English Madrigals which reproduces several of the pieces from Morley's collection.
List of Renaissance composers

References

Sources
Books

 
 
 

Journals and articles

  
 
 

Triumphs of Oriana, The
Triumphs of Oriana, The
English madrigals